During the 1996–97 English football season, Norwich City F.C. competed in the Football League First Division.

Season summary
In 1996, Mike Walker returned for a second spell as Norwich manager to the delight of the fans but during the season he could not achieve promotion during his first season back at the club with only a 13th-place finish. After a great start which saw the Canaries lose only 2 out of the first 14 games, Norwich's brilliant form deteriorated from the end of October, picking up 3 points from the next 10 matches with 7 defeats during the winless run which all but ended their chances of automatic promotion.

Final league table

Results
Norwich City's score comes first

Legend

Football League First Division

FA Cup

League Cup

Players

First-team squad
Squad at end of season

Notes

References

Norwich City F.C. seasons
Norwich City